Wilhelmine Halberstadt (24 January 1776 – 11 March 1841) was a German educator and author.

Biography
Elisabeth Friederike Wilhelmine Halberstadt was born in Corbach, a small town in the uplands west of Kassel. Carl Franz Halberstadt, her father, was a lawyer employed as a secretary by the Count Reuß. He thought himself a rich man. Before he married, he had traveled extensively in Europe and later crossed the Atlantic, acquiring land in America. Becoming homesick, he had returned home, however, and spotted the beautiful young childless widow Maria Christiane Speirmann (born Schmidt) at church. They subsequently married. Maria also came from a wealthy family. However, it subsequently turned out that Maria's father's guardian, having "delayed" providing proper financial accounts for some years, had been embezzling and spending the family monies. He was imprisoned but the family fortune was not recovered. Finding that they were not, after all, a wealthy family, Carl Franz Halberstadt travelled back to America to sell his possessions there. On the way he was involved in a shipwreck after which he was never seen again. Attempts to obtain details of his presumed death came to nothing. Maria Halberstadt was left to bring up the children alone. She had received an excellent education, but now, despite her aristocratic background and habits, she found herself obliged to live in a state of poverty for which life had not prepared her.

Wilhelmine Halberstadt was intelligent and keen to educate herself quickly in order that she might become a teacher, which would enable her to bring an income into the family home to support her mother and siblings. Between 1806 and 1812 she was employed as a tutor-governess by the family of Mayor Tesdorpf in Lübeck. The city had for centuries been commercially dynamic and prosperous, but Halberstadt's time there coincided with the French occupation, which sources describe as a "time of horrors" (" Schreckenszeit Lübecks"). After that she returned to live with her mother and attempted to set up her own school in Trier, where by this time her mother was living. In Trier she was by no means "an unknown". Her (in some ways strangely "modern") views on women's education had been included in her 1808 publication, "Über Würde und Bestimmung der Frauen" (loosely: "On the dignity and fate of women"). The book had earned her the good will of the Roman Catholic church establishment in Trier, which meant that even the bishop backed her. Nevertheless, there was plenty of opposition in the city, which at least one commentator linked with the fact that she was "perhaps the only protestant woman in Trier".

The project nevertheless prospered and for a time she was able to be happy and productive in Trier. Sources are inconsistent as to the date of her mother's death, but after that occurred Halberstadt became engaged to marry the author Karl Borbstädt. He was a former government tax official and had good connections with the Prussian government over in Berlin. The two of them had much in common in terms of their idealism and their belief in improving the human condition. They were committed to inner morality, inner religiosity and the best possible education for children and young people. They shared a grand plan to create a major educational institution, possibly in Berlin. It was not to be. Karl Borbstädt took a trip to Berlin to make administrative arrangements, but he never came back. Instead he suddenly died. Wilhelmine Halberstadt's grief was "boundless". Once more on her own, she sought to moderate the impact of the bereavement by redoubling her own educational work.

The Rhine Province (including Trier) was particularly badly hit by the crop failures of 1816 and 1817. The income from the school fell. Austerity also triggered a growth in inter-denominational strife, which disadvantaged an institution run by a Protestant in a Catholic province. In 1822 Halberstadt decided to close the school. Her intention now was to restrict her teaching activities to private lessons, working for families she knew and trusted. In 1822 she also published a more substantial work on pedagogy, assembling her accumulated experience of teaching into just four volumes. "Gemälde häuslicher Glückseligkeit" (loosely,"Images of Domestic Happiness and Joy") was influential among educationists and other opinion formers of the time. Short of funds, she sent a copy to the Russian emperor. Although the book was apparently sent unsolicited, the czar sent her a substantial payment "in recognition".

It was not only the Czar of Russia who had been impressed by her contributions. Frederick William III of Prussia had also become an admirer of her educational achievements in his Rhine Province, and was no doubt aware of her written works. He made arrangements to provide her with a pension, but when she became aware of the king's intentions, she quickly wrote to him asking if he would instead be willing to fund her new project. Her plan was to select the most suitable girls from orphanages and train them to become elementary school teachers. Girls from higher social classes were not, she insisted, really suitable for work as elementary school teachers. There are suggestions that Halberstadt had been influenced by the ideas propounded by Swiss educationalist Johann Heinrich Pestalozzi. Her project was timely. The Prussian King had recently appointed the kingdom's first Minister for Education. Halberstadt's project met with approval and the Education Minister, Karl vom Stein zum Altenstein received instructions to look at her proposals sympathetically. Due to ongoing religious disputes in the Rhine Province it was still not possible to pursue the project in Trier. Towards the end of in 1822, Halberstadt relocated from to Berlin, where her protestantism was not a particular issue.

In he end it was in Kassel that in 1823 she found the opportunity to set up an educational institution for daughters of the wealthy. By this time she had also found time to produce a second edition of her book "Ueber Würde und Bestimmung des Weibes, jungen Frauenzimmern gewidmet". There was also a new teaching book: "Schulbuch, als erste Uebung im Lesen und Denken, nach der Lautmethode. Ein Geschenk für fleißige Kinder." (loosely,"Textbook, as a first exercise in reading and thinking phonetically. A gift for industrious children"). These two books were both widely welcomed, and the first of them was even translated into French. They provided the foundation for her first educational institution which soon had more than 100 pupils. Still in Kassel, in October 1831 she was able to pull together the money to launch the first "Halberstädtsche Free school" for poor girls. It thrived, and was taken over by the municipal schools board only in 1876. In 1833 she set up the "Halberstädtsche Fräuleinstiftung für vaterlose Töchter" ("Halberstadt young ladies' foundation for fatherless daughters"). The number of educational institutions that she was able to set up grew, with two of them funded from her own resources. In order further to increase the money available to her foundation she also launched a monthly journal in 1835, which appeared in German, French and English, and which she named the "Ehrentempel europäischer Classiker" ("Honoured temple of European classics"). She lived long enough to see her foundation grow and flourish. Through her foundation thousands of children were educated, clothed, fed and trained for life.

By the end of her life, through the educational institutions she had created and through her writings, she had become famous, able to be mentioned in the same breath as the great Halle scholar-philanthropist and education pioneer August Hermann Francke.

Notes

References

Writers from Kassel
19th-century German educators
19th-century German women writers
1776 births
1841 deaths